Alvanley is a civil parish in Cheshire West and Chester, England.  It contains the village of Alvanley, but is otherwise rural.  Included in the parish are 24 buildings that are recorded in the National Heritage List for England as designated listed buildings.  Most of these are houses or farm buildings; the others consist of a church plus two tombs in the churchyard, a school, a guidepost, and a structure that is either a wayside or a plague cross.

Key

Buildings

See also
Listed buildings in Dunham-on-the-Hill
Listed buildings in Frodsham
Listed buildings in Helsby
Listed buildings in Manley

References
Citations

Sources

Listed buildings in Cheshire West and Chester
Lists of listed buildings in Cheshire